The 1909 Detroit College Tigers football team  was an American football team that represented Detroit College (later renamed the University of Detroit) as an independent during the 1909 college football season. In its second season under head coach George A. Kelly, the team compiled a 3–1–2 record and shut out four opponents, but was outscored by its opponents by a combined total of 35 to 17.  The team opened the season with a 27–0 loss to Michigan Agricultural (later renamed Michigan State University).

Schedule

References

Detroit College Tigers
Detroit Titans football seasons
Detroit College Tigers football
Detroit College Tigers football